Phinius Gage were an English underground skate punk/melodic hardcore band who started up in 2001 and were active until 2008. They reformed in 2015 and played a reunion tour.

History
The band is named after Phineas Gage, an 1840s railway foreman, who had a large iron rod driven through his head and thereby lost part of his brain.

They played over 500 shows in their existence, touring with many bands including Streetlight Manifesto, Spunge, Whitmore, Flood Of Red, Reuben, RedLightsFlash, Ten Foot Pole, Farse, and 4Ft Fingers. They released debut mini LP More Haste More Speed in 2003 on Deck Cheese Records – and their first full length, The Feeling Somethings Wrong on the same label in 2005.

Signing to Fond of Life Records in Germany, the band released a compilation of old and new tracks in 2006 entitled Brighton Rock, which included the band's only single, Brighton Rock, the video for which received airplay on MTV2 and Scuzz. The band then released their final album in 2007, Seek Out Your Foes, which is generally considered the band's best work. It made Kerrang's 'Best Albums Of 2007' list. However, the band split suddenly soon after.

Members have gone on to form many other bands, including Lay It On The Line. Mike Scott has also had a solo career.

The Band have recently announced a reunion tour across some major cities in the UK. At this stage it is not known if this will lead to a new album and more touring.

Musical style and influence
Phinius Gage plays fast, melodic hardcore music in the style of Pennywise, Strung Out, Consumed, Rise Against, and other bands of the SoCal description from record labels including Fat Wreck Chords and Epitaph.

Members

 Carl "Karlos" Brown – guitars, backing vocals (2005–present)
 Mike Scott – (bass, lead vocals, (2003–present)
 Matt Steele – drums, backing vocals (2002–present)
 Ade Holder – guitars, lead vocals (2002–present)

Previous members 2002–2006
 Damo St George – vocals
 Martyn Haigh – bass
 Andy Bligh – guitar
 Ben Ince – guitar
 Paul Fields – guitar
 Gary Yay – bass
 Jamie Kirkpatrick – bass
 Edward Higgs – bass
 Chas Mataz – guitar
 Kalem Buckham – drums
 Keith Whitby – bass

Discography

Compilations
 Amped Up And Ready To Go (In At The Deep End Records, UK)
 Value Slices (Deck Cheese, UK)
 Cheese Supreme (free promo CD with Big Cheese Magazine, UK)
 Punktastic Unscene (Punktastic Recordings, UK)
 Punktastic Unscene 3 (Punktastic Recordings, UK)
 Ashcan Records 1 (Ashcan Records, Luxembourg)
 Change The Station II (White Russian Records, Netherlands)
 In Defense of Rock 2 (Fond of Life/Winged Skull, Germany)
 Quintisentially British (UK)
 Brighton Rocks (UK)

References

External links
 Phinius Gage Official MySpace page
 Review of Phinius Gage album "The Feeling Something's Wrong" from national website Punktastic
 Phinius Gage tracks played on BBC Radio 1's Lock Up Punk Show
 Phinius Gage Bandcamp page
 Lay It On The Line Bandcamp page

Underground punk scene in the United Kingdom
British hardcore punk groups
English punk rock groups
Melodic hardcore groups
Skate punk groups